The Journal of Nursing Education is a monthly peer-reviewed nursing journal. It was established in 1962 and is abstracted and indexed in MEDLINE.

History
The Journal of Nursing Education began as a quarterly journal published by McGraw-Hill. The first editor-in-chief was Alice Bicknell, although she was supplanted by a small editorial board in the journal's second year. This editorial board continued their oversight until 1981, at which time SLACK Incorporated became the journal's publisher and assigned Margaret Carnine as its editor. , the editor-in-chief is Amy J. Barton, PhD, and the associate editor is  Teri A. Murray, PhD.

In 2002, the journal increased from nine issues per year to 12.

Editors-in-chief 
The following persons have been or are editor-in-chief of the Journal of Nursing Education:
 Alice Bicknell (1962)
 Editorial board (1963–1980)
 Margaret Carnine (1981–1982)
 Rheba de Tornyay (1983–1990)
 Christine A. Tanner (1991–2012)
 Janis P. Bellack (2012–2018)
 Amy J. Barton (2018–present)

See also 

List of nursing journals

References

External links 
 

General nursing journals
Monthly journals
English-language journals
Publications established in 1962